Martine Stephanie Janssen (born 16 June 1977 in Dieren, Gelderland) is a former breaststroke swimmer from the Netherlands, who competed for her native country at the 1992 Summer Olympics in Barcelona, Spain. There she was eliminated in the heats of the 100m and 200m Breaststroke.

References
 Dutch Olympic Committee

1977 births
Living people
People from Rheden
Sportspeople from Gelderland
Olympic swimmers of the Netherlands
Dutch female breaststroke swimmers
Swimmers at the 1992 Summer Olympics